Unadilla Valley High School is a public high school located in New Berlin, Chenango County, New York, U.S.A., and is the only high school operated by the Unadilla Valley Central School District.

Footnotes

Schools in Chenango County, New York
Public high schools in New York (state)